Orpheus Emerged is a novella written by Jack Kerouac in 1945 when he was at Columbia University. It was discovered after his death and published in 2000.

Orpheus Emerged chronicles the passions, conflicts, and dreams of a group of bohemians searching for truth while studying at a university. Kerouac wrote the story shortly after meeting Allen Ginsberg, William S. Burroughs, Lucien Carr, and others in and around Columbia University who would form the core of the Beats.

References

1945 American novels
American novellas
Novels by Jack Kerouac
Novels published posthumously
2000 American novels